Sat.1 Gold is a German free-to-air television channel aimed at a females aged between 49 and 65. It is ProSiebenSat.1 Media's sixth channel in Germany. The channel manager is Marc Rasmus. Sat.1 Gold received a broadcast licence from the Kommission für Zulassung und Aufsicht der Medienanstalten (ZAK) (German: Commission for authorization and supervision of media institutions) on 20 November 2012. The channel is regulated by the Thüringische Landesmedienanstalt (TLM), based in the state of Thuringia. The channel started broadcasting on 17 January 2013 at 20:13 CET with a 2-minute countdown, followed by a promo and a puppet show. The channel then broadcast the German film The Whore.

Programming 
The channel mainly broadcasts German TV productions from the ProSiebenSat.1 archives. Sat.1 Gold will broadcast a spinoff of the magazine program Akte – Reporter kämpfen für Sie and  Süddeutsche TV Thema. Also a daily midday magazine is planned to be broadcast. Programmes in the evening consists of documentaries, movies, thrillers and series.

The channel also shows tennis tournaments from ATP, WTA and ITF. A spinoff from the German sport show ran which is ran tennis started airing in April 2013.

Series

Allein unter Bauern (2013-2014)
Alles außer Mord (2013-2014)
Alles außer Sex (2013-2014)
Broti & Pacek – Irgendwas ist immer (2013)
Cold Case Files (Cold Case Files - Wahre Fälle der US-Ermittler) (2017–present)
Comanche Moon (2016)
Daktari (2015–present)
Danni Lowinski (2013-2015, 2017–present)
Der Bulle von Tölz (2015–present)
Der letzte Bulle (2013-2015)
Diagnosis: Murder (Diagnose: Mord) (2014–present)
Edel & Starck (2013-2015)
Falcon Crest (2015-2017)
Flikken Maastricht (Cops Maastricht) (2017)
Für alle Fälle Stefanie (2013, 2017–present)
Hallo, Onkel Doc! (2017–present)
Highway to Heaven (Ein Engel auf Erden) (2014)
Klinikum Berlin Mitte – Leben in Bereitschaft (2013)
Kojak (2015–2016)
Kung Fu (2015-2016)
Murder, She Wrote (Mord ist ihr Hobby) (2014–present)
One Born Every Minute (US) (One Born Every Minute - Die Babystation) (2017)
R. I. S. – Die Sprache der Toten (2013-2016)
SK Kölsch (2015-2016)
Surviving Evil (Surviving Evil - Im Angesicht des Bösen) (2017-2018)
The FBI Files (F.B.I. - Dem Verbrechen auf der Spur) (2016-2017)
The Love Boat (Love Boat) (2016-2017)

Audience share

Germany

References

External links
 

ProSiebenSat.1 Media
Television stations in Germany
Television stations in Austria
Television stations in Switzerland
Television channels and stations established in 2013
German-language television stations
2013 establishments in Germany
Mass media in Munich